Vermont is a suburb of Melbourne, Victoria, Australia,  east of Melbourne's Central Business District, located within the Cities of Maroondah and Whitehorse local government areas.

The meaning of (behind) Vermont is "Green Hill".

Vermont is bordered by Mitcham to the north, Nunawading and Forest Hill to the west, Vermont South to the south and Wantirna and Ringwood to the east.

The suburb of Vermont is the location of the Vermont Volunteers Roll of Honour for the First World War. The honour board used to hang in the former Mechanics Institute Hall, which was on the site now occupied by the Scout Hall. Some of the names listed are also included on the Mitcham and Blackburn War Memorials.

History
L. L. Vale Post Office opened on 1 November 1881 and was renamed Vermont in 1889. It was closed between 1895 and 1899. A Vermont East Post Office was open between 1964 and 1993.

Demographics
In the 2016 census the population of Vermont was 10,442, approximately 51.2% female and 48.8% male.

The median/average age of the people in Vermont is 40 years of age.

64.1% of people were born in Australia. The most common countries of birth were China (excludes SARs and Taiwan) 7.5%, England 3.1%, India 2.9%, Malaysia 2.4% and Vietnam 1.5%

66.9% of people only spoke English at home. Other languages spoken at home included Mandarin 9.5%, Cantonese 4.2%, Vietnamese 1.5%, Hindi 1.2% and Sinhalese 1.1%

The most common responses for religion in Vermont (State Suburbs) were No Religion, so described 36.2%, Catholic 19.4%, Anglican 8.8%, Not stated 7.1% and Buddhism 4.3%. In Vermont (State Suburbs), Christianity was the largest religious group reported overall (50.9%) (this figure excludes not stated responses).

Transport

Vermont is serviced by five bus routes. Buses run 7 days of the week.

One of Melbourne's major arterials, Canterbury Road, passes through the centre of Vermont, running east to west. It is intersected by Mitcham and Boronia Roads, which run north and south-east respectively.

Education
Vermont is home to four schools:
 Vermont Secondary College
Vermont Primary School
St James' Catholic Primary School
St Timothy's Catholic Community Primary School

Sport

Australian Rules Football
 
The suburb has an Australian Rules football team, the Vermont Eagles, competing in the Eastern Football League.

Soccer
 
The Whitehorse United Soccer Club is located in Vermont South, previously winning the State League 4 East competition in 2017, the club is currently competing in the State league 3 south-east competition.

Futsal
 
Vermont Futsal Club was founded in 2015 and has competed in the state levels of Victoria and has played previously in State League One. They are currently competing in the State League Three competition at Futsal Oz Brunswick.

Cricket
 
There is also the Vermont Cricket Club.

Churches
Vermont is also host to a number of churches including:
 Stairway Church
 St. Luke’s Anglican Church

See also
 City of Nunawading – Vermont was previously within this former local government area.
 List of Melbourne suburbs

References

Vermont, Victoria
Vermont, Victoria
Vermont, Victoria